Birthday Letter is a 2019 South Korean television series starring Song Geon-hee and Jo Soo-min, along with Jeon Moo-song and Jung Young-sook. It aired on KBS2 from 11–12 September 2019 on Wednesday at 22:00 until 23:10 and Thursday at 21:55 until 23:10 for 4 episodes.

Plot
This series is set during the Korean Independence War in 1945 and celebrates the Chuseok Party.

During the Japanese colonial rule era, Kim Moo-gil (Song Geon-hee) and Yeo Il-ae (Jo Soo-min) are childhood friends who each other's first love. Against their wills, both Moo-gil and Il-ae are forced to leave Hapcheon, South Korea and go to Hiroshima, Japan for conscription. In there, they are separated from each other and suffered an atomic bomb. Later, in 2019, they finally returned home alive and Moo-gil (now Jeon Moo-song) receive a birthday letter from his first love Il-ae (now Jung Young-sook).

Cast

People in 1945 years (past)
Song Geon-hee as Kim Moo-gil
Jo Soo-min as Yeo Il-ae, Moo-gil's hometown friend and first love.
Go Geon-han as Jo Ham-duk, Moo-gil's hometown friend.
Kim Yi-kyung as Jo Young-geum, Ham-duk's little sister who has crush on Moo-gil. 
Kim Hee-jung as Moo-gil and Moo-jin's mother
Hong Seok-woo as Kim Moo-jin, Moo-gil's big brother.
Oh Man-seok as Ham-duk and Young-geum's father
Ham Sung-min as Joo Geun-kkae

People in 2019 years (now)
Jeon Moo-song as old Kim Moo-gil
Jeon So-min as Kim Jae-yeon, Moo-gil's granddaughter.
Kim Kyung-nam as Goo Ki-woong, Jae-yeon's lover and college classmate.
Jung Young-sook as old Yeo Il-ae

Rating

References

External links
 
Birthday Letter at Naver 

Korean-language television shows
2019 South Korean television series debuts
2019 South Korean television series endings
South Korean action television series
Korean Broadcasting System television dramas
South Korean thriller television series
Korean War television series
2020s war drama films
2019 war drama films
Television series set in Korea under Japanese rule
South Korean romance television series